Marie-France Sagot is director of research at the French Institute for Research in Computer Science and Automation (INRIA) and a member of staff at Claude Bernard University Lyon 1 where she works on algorithms for computational biology and gene prediction and biological sequence analysis. She was elected a Fellow of the International Society for Computational Biology (ISCB) in 2019 for "outstanding contributions to the fields of computational biology and bioinformatics". Since 2002 she has been a visiting research fellow at King's College London.

References

French bioinformaticians
Year of birth missing (living people)
Living people